Duke Paul Frederick of Mecklenburg (given names: Paul Frederick Charles Alexander Michael Hugh; 12 May 1882 – 21 May 1904) was a member of the House of Mecklenburg-Schwerin and a German soldier and sailor. He was styled His Highness Duke Paul Frederick of Mecklenburg.

German soldier and sailor
Duke Paul Frederick Charles Alexander Michael Hugh of Mecklenburg was born in Schwerin, the eldest child of Duke Paul Frederick of Mecklenburg and his wife, Princess Marie of Windisch-Graetz. Duke Paul Frederick was a grandson of Frederick Francis II, Grand Duke of Mecklenburg. Shortly after his birth he became the youngest soldier in the world when he was admitted as a soldier into the German Imperial Army and assigned to the 15th Mecklenburg Dragoons by Emperor William I. Duke Paul Frederick and his siblings were raised as Roman Catholics and were brought up in Venice, where his family became friends with Cardinal Sarto (later Pope Pius X), who was a regular visitor to the family.

On 21 April 1884 Duke Paul Frederick's place in the line of succession to the throne of Mecklenburg-Schwerin was superseded by his uncles after his father renounced his own and his descendants' rights of succession. However, in the event of his uncles' families becoming extinct, Duke Paul Frederick's line could succeed, as long as the successor converted from Roman Catholicism to Protestantism.

Despite being put into the Army shortly after his birth, Duke Paul Frederick eventually pursued a career in the German Imperial Navy. He rose to the rank of lieutenant and in 1902, while serving on the training ship , crossed the Atlantic to visit the United States of America and cruise in the Southern waters of the country.

Duke Paul Frederick of Mecklenburg died unmarried in Kiel at the age of 22.

Ancestry

References

External links
S.M.S. Charlotte

1882 births
1904 deaths
Dukes of Mecklenburg-Schwerin
House of Mecklenburg-Schwerin
People from Schwerin
Imperial German Navy personnel